Golden West High School is a four-year public high school in the Visalia Unified district of Visalia, California. It is one of eight city high schools and enrolls the third highest number of students.

Academics
Golden West offers 13 AP and four honors courses. In the 2018–2019 academic year, the average ACT score was 21 and the average SAT score was 59.2%. In the 2019–2020 academic year, about 61% of students were eligible for free lunch (compared to the state average of 53%), and about seven percent were eligible for reduced lunch (compared to the state average of seven percent).

In the 2018–2019 academic year, the graduation rate was 96%.  Sixty-six percent of 2018 graduates attended two-year colleges or vocational schools; 19% attended four-year universities; seven percent entered the workforce; and four percent went into the military.

Extracurriculars

Athletics 
Golden West offers eight boys sports (cross country, water polo, football, basketball, soccer, golf, tennis, baseball), eight girls sports (cross country, golf, tennis, volleyball, water polo, basketball, soccer, softball), and three co-ed sports (wrestling, track, swimming).

Clubs 
Golden West offers 20 clubs, including academic clubs, cultural clubs, and athletic clubs. Students can participate in preexisting clubs or apply to create their own clubs on campus. The Future Business Leaders of America (also known as FBLA) club competed in and placed first in several events at the 2021 Central Section Leadership Conference, including Entrepreneurship, Hospitality & Event Management and Marketing.

Student Body
Golden West is a Title I public school with a majority Hispanic population.

Notable alumni
 Shane Costa - professional baseball player for the Kansas City Royals
 Beau Mills - professional baseball player for the Cleveland Indians
 Chris Schwinden - professional baseball player for the New York Mets
 Betsy Wolfe - Broadway actress and singer, best known for her roles in Waitress and Falsettos
 Kevin Downes - movie producer, actor
 Matt Black - photographer
 Miles Gaston Villanueva - actor known for Law & Order True Crime
 Linda Nguyen Lopez- ceramic artist

References

External links
 Golden West High School web page

High schools in Tulare County, California
Public high schools in California
Education in Visalia, California
1980 establishments in California